Pimeyden Hehku is an EP by the black metal band Horna. It was released on Debemur Morti Productions in 2007 as an MCD containing the first four tracks. It was also released by Deviant Records as a 12" MLP limited to 500 copies.

Track listing
Side 1:
Nostalgiaa - 5:33  
Avain Tuhossani - 4:41  
Kirotun Käden Kosketus - 4:14  
Verisellä Ovella - 5:41

Side 2:
Talvenvarjo (pt. 1 & 2) -

Personnel

Additional personnel
 Christophe Szpajdel - logo

External links
Metal Archives
Official Horna Site

2007 EPs
Horna EPs